Pistol is a 1973 Swedish drama film directed by George Tirl. Inga Tidblad won the award for Best Actress at the 10th Guldbagge Awards.

Cast
 Inga Tidblad as Alisia von Svärd
 Gunnar Björnstrand as Alisia's Friend
 Håkan Westergren as Albert
 Nils Eklund
 Bernt Lundquist as Foreman
 Bertil Norström as Chief Superintendent
 Lennart Pilotti as Witness
 Åke Lindström as Mayor
 Carl-Axel Elfving
 Birger Åsander

References

External links
 
 

1973 films
1973 drama films
Swedish drama films
1970s Swedish-language films
1970s Swedish films